WNYV (94.1 FM) is a radio station broadcasting a classic country format. Licensed to Whitehall, New York, United States, the station serves the Saratoga Springs, New York, area. The station is owned by Loud Media. WNYV and its AM sister, WVNR in Poultney, simulcast 100% of the time and go by the on-air slogan of "K94.1".  It is also simulcasts on WABY 900 AM in Watervliet, New York and W230DK in Albany, New York.

WNYV 94.1 FM signal covers Glens Falls, Queensbury, parts of Saratoga, and parts of western Vermont. A small mountain range inhibits the signal from reaching clearly into Rutland.

Lakes Region Radio broadcast live from local high school and local college sports contests, providing a full schedule of coverage.

On May 5, 2020, it was announced the station had been sold to Loud Media pending FCC approval.

Loud Media now operates the station via LMA 

On July 25, 2020, Loud Media rebranded the station as "K94.1" playing classic country. The new format and branding replicates its sister station K96.9 KYAP.

On December 9, 2020, WNYV began simulcasting on WABY in Watervliet, New York, and W231DU in Albany, New York.

See also
 WVNR

References

External links

NYV
Radio stations established in 1990
1990 establishments in New York (state)
Classic country radio stations in the United States